Toto is a census town in the Gumla CD block in the Gumla subdivision of the Gumla district in the Indian state of Jharkhand.

Geography

Location                                                                  
Toto is located at

Area overview 
The map alongside presents a rugged area, consisting partly of flat-topped hills called pat and partly of an undulating plateau, in the south-western portion of Chota Nagpur Plateau. Three major rivers – the Sankh, South Koel and North Karo - along with their numerous tributaries, drain the area. The hilly area has large deposits of Bauxite. 93.7% of the population lives in rural areas. 

Note: The map alongside presents some of the notable locations in the district. All places marked in the map are linked in the larger full screen map.

Infrastructure 
Among the civic amenities, it had  of roads with both closed and open drains, the protected water supply involved uncovered well, hand pump. It had 564 domestic electric connections. Among the medical facilities, it had 10 hospitals, 9 dispensaries, 9 health centres, 1 family welfare centre, 1 maternity and child welfare centre, 1 maternity homes, 1 veterinary hospital, 3 medicine shops. An important commodity it produced was timber. It had the branch offices of 1 nationalised bank, 1 cooperative bank.

Demographics 
According to the 2011 Census of India, Toto had a total population of 5,237, of which 2,709 (52%) were males and 2,528 (48%) were females. Population in the age range 0-6 years was 797. The total number of literate persons in Toto was 3,564 (80.27% of the population over 6 years). 

(*For language details see Gumla block#Language and religion)

Education 
Sishu Mandir Toto is a Hindi-medium coeducational institution established in 1989. It has facilities for teaching from class I to class X. The school has a library with 100 books.   

Government High School Toto is a Hindi-medium coeducational institution established in 1964. It has facilities for teaching in classes IX and X. The school has a playground and a library with 380 books.

References 
 

 

Cities and towns in Gumla district